Brandon DiCamillo (born 1976) is an American former television personality, actor, stunt performer, filmmaker, and musician. He was a founding member of the CKY crew and rose to fame through appearances in the CKY video series and MTV's Jackass, Viva La Bam, and Bam's Unholy Union series.

Life and career
DiCamillo was born in 1976 in West Chester, Pennsylvania. He first appeared as a member of the CKY crew in the CKY video series, which he co-wrote together with Bam Margera.

He was cast with other members of the crew for the MTV reality comedy series Jackass, appearing in the television series and its films. When the series ended in 2002, DiCamillo was featured in Bam Margera's film Haggard: The Movie, which DiCamillo also co-wrote. He then starred in Margera's Viva La Bam reality television show, which ran from 2003 to 2005. He co-starred in his own show with Rake Yohn called Blastazoid, which only lasted two episodes until MTV canceled the show due to dispute between MTV and the makers of the show. DiCamillo then appeared in Bam Margera's Bam's Unholy Union TV series. In 2008, he starred in Chris Raab's short film Hotdog Casserole. In 2009, he starred in Margera's Minghags.

DiCamillo also released prank phone call recordings. In 2001, he released a collection of calls titled Otimen Recording Hell! (A.K.A. Bran's Freestyles). In 2010, he released four more prank call collections, under the name Gnarkall, via digital download through his own record label, Roman Sausage. The first three volumes are available on iTunes with the fourth an exclusive to CD Baby. The fourth volume includes all the tracks from the first three volumes, as well as thirty extra minutes of prank calls.

He was the comedic voice talent and vocalist of the parody band Gnarkill, and is also known by some for his prank calls and freestyle raps, some of which can be viewed in the CKY videos, on the Volume 2 CD, and on the Otimen Recording Hell CD produced by Bam Margera.

He made a cameo appearance as John Madden in the Mega64's "Mega64: Madden Rap 2012" YouTube video. Additionally, he has also provided voiceovers for the video game Trials HD and its sequel Trials Evolution.

In 2017, DiCamillo started the Attic Aficionados podcast with Tom Barbalet.

Bam Margera stated in a 2017 Reddit post that once Viva La Bam concluded in 2006, he and DiCamillo lost contact. However, DiCamillo and Margera did work together on Radio Bam, Bam's Unholy Union and Minghags in the time since Viva La Bam ended. Since Minghags, DiCamillo has not appeared in any CKY-related project. It is believed he decided to move out of the public eye. This was confirmed by Joe Frantz in 2017, stating that DiCamillo formally renounced his affiliation with the CKY crew years prior in order to live a private life with his wife and children.

Personal life
DiCamillo previously worked for Neiman-Marcus. He dislikes Hollywood work, and has said that the CKY work for MTV was sometimes "too corporate".

DiCamillo married his longtime girlfriend in October 2014 and the couple have two children.

DiCamillo is a fan of the Philadelphia Eagles and Calgary Flames.

Gaming world record

In September 2008, DiCamillo achieved a world record in the arcade video game Mortal Kombat. The event was held at Challenge Arcade in Wyomissing, Pennsylvania, and was attended by approximately two dozen event participants, as well as Mark Alpiger (representing ClassicArcadeGaming.com) and Chief Referee Dave Nelson (representing TwinGalaxies.com). DiCamillo's final score was 10,226,500, which beat previous record-holder David Nelson's score of 7,691,000. In 2009, DiCamillo's world record was beaten by Isaiah-TriForce Johnson, with a score of 24,821,500, and again on September 27, 2017, by Patrick J Maher with a score of 25,402,000. DiCamillo has dropped to sixth place as of 2018.

Filmography

Television

Films

Music videos

Discography
 Volume 2 (1999)
 Otimen Recording Hell! (A.K.A. Bran's Freestyles) (2001)
 Gnarkill (2002)
 Gnarkill vs. Unkle Matt and the ShitBirdz (2006)
 Gnarkill III (2008)
 Gnarkall Prank Calls, Vol. 1 (2010)
 Gnarkall Prank Calls, Vol. 2 Assault on Call Waiting (2010)
 Gnarkall Prank Calls, Vol. 3 Spring Time Cootchie (2010)
 Gnarkall Prank Calls, Vol. 4 Pleasures Treasures (2010)
 Brandon Dicamillo, Pizza Pasta Pizzelle 1 (2012)
 Brandon Dicamillo, Pizza Pasta Pizzelle 2 (2012)

References

External links

1976 births
American people of Italian descent
American television personalities
CKY
Jackass (TV series)
American stunt performers
People from West Chester, Pennsylvania
Living people